Claudia Letizia also known as Lady Letizia (born 22 March 1979 in Pompei) is an Italian actress, dancer, television and radio hostess and singer. She is known for having participated in the twelfth series of the reality show Grande Fratello, the Italian version of Big Brother.

Biography
Born in Pompei 1979, Letizia grew up in San Giorgio a Cremano. She graduated as an accountant, then took dance and acting classes.

Letizia has participated in various television programs, including in 2010, when she competed under the stage name of Lady Letizia in the Sky 1 talent show Lady Burlesque, which proclaimed her the queen of Italian burlesque. The following year she was a competitor in Grande Fratello 12.

Letizia was an actress in the film L'ultima ruota del carro by Giovanni Veronesi and Il mio uomo perfetto by Nilo Sciarrone in 2018. She starred in the musical Carosone, with the singer Sal Da Vinci, in which he played Maruzzella, in the Sky series 1992; and in two seasons of È arrivata la Felicità broadcast on Rai 1.

Letizia appeared as a television reviewer in various Rai and Mediaset programs, including Tiki Taka, Mattino 5 and Pomeriggio 5. She is a presenter on Radio Kiss Kiss for the program "Facciamolo adesso" ("Let's do it now"), broadcast every night.

Television 
 Beato tra le donne (2003)
 Ciao Darwin 5 (Canale 5, 2007)
 Lady Burlesque (Sky 1, 2010)
 Grande Fratello (Canale 5, 2011)
 Il processo del lunedì, Rai 3, (2015)
 Le Iene, Italia 1. (2015/2018)
 Tiki Taka - Il calcio è il nostro gioco 
 Mattino Cinque
 Pomeriggio Cinque

Filmography

Television 
 2009: 7 vite
 2009: Un posto al sole estate
 2010: Un posto al sole
 2010: La nuova squadra
 2015: 1992
 2015–2016: È arrivata la felicità
 2016: Un posto al sole
 2018: È arrivata la felicità 2

Theater 
 2009: Telegaribaldi Celebration
 2012: The show (second edition)
 2013: Ti ricordi il Varietà?
 2013–2014: Carosone l’americano di Napoli
 2015–2018: C'era una volta il burlesque

Video 
 2010: music video for a song by rap band Resurrection 
 2010: music video for a song by the duo Ludo Brusco & Mr Hyde

Radio 
 2009: Interviewer on the Radio Marte Stereo program "Notte azzurra"
 2010–2011: presenter on Radio Punto Zero
 2017–2018: presenter on Radio Kiss Kiss

References

External links 
Official Website
 

1979 births
20th-century Italian actresses
21st-century Italian actresses
Italian television actresses
Glamour models
Living people
People from Pompei
People from San Giorgio a Cremano
Vedettes (cabaret)